Shango  is a 1970 Italian Spaghetti Western film directed by Edoardo Mulargia. The film was written by Mulargia and Anthony Steffen, and stars Steffen as the titular Shango.

Plot

Cast
 Anthony Steffen as Shango
 Eduardo Fajardo as  Major Droster
 Maurice Poli as  Martinez
  Barbara Nelli as  Consuelo
 Giusva Fioravanti as  Pedrito
 Attilio Dottesio as  Fernandez
 Gabriella Giorgelli as  Pamela
  Massimo Carocci as  Scott
  Spartaco Conversi as  Bragna
 Liana Del Balzo as  Tana

References

External links
 

Spaghetti Western films
1970 Western (genre) films
1970 films
Films directed by Edoardo Mulargia
Films with screenplays by Edoardo Mulargia
1970s Italian films